Klemens Murańka (born 31 August 1994) is a Polish ski jumper, a member of the national team, a 2014 Junior World Champion in team, a bronze medalist of 2015 World Championship in team.

Personal life
On 28 August 2014 his fiancée gave birth to their son named Klemens Jr. On 25 April 2015 he married Agnieszka Rzadkosz. On 4 January 2021 their second son was born.

Career
On 31 August 2004, his 10th birthday, he jumped 135.5 m at Wielka Krokiew in Zakopane (only 4.5 m shorter than the then-official record). On 14 October 2007 he took third place in Summer Polish Championship. In December 2006, 2007 he achieved bronze in Winter Polish Championship.

Murańka debuted in World Cup during qualification to competition in Zakopane in season 2007/08 at age 13. He is the youngest competitor in history who was allowed to take part in World Cup. He took 65th place in qualification.

On 1 February 2014 he won a gold medal with Polish team in squad Jakub Wolny, Krzysztof Biegun and Aleksander Zniszczoł at 2014 Junior World Championship held in Val di Fiemme.

Murańka debuted in the World Championships 2015 in Falun, Sweden. He was 17th on normal hill (K-90) and 20th in the competition on the large hill Lugnet (K-120). On 28 February 2015 Polish team in squad: Murańka, Piotr Żyła, Kamil Stoch and Jan Ziobro achieved bronze medal of World Championships 2015 in team.

On 29 January 2021 he jumped 153 meters during the qualification round of the Willingen Six tournament on the Mühlenkopfschanze in Willingen and beat by one meter the previous hill record which belonged to Janne Ahonen (2005) and Jurij Tepes (2014). He became third Polish ski jumper who jumped 150 or more meters on this hill. It was the first hill record in his career.

World Championships

Individual

Team

Klemens Murańka's starts at World Championships

World Cup

Season standings

Individual starts

References

External links
 

Polish male ski jumpers
FIS Nordic World Ski Championships medalists in ski jumping
Sportspeople from Zakopane
Living people
1994 births
21st-century Polish people